León Fútbol Club Premier was a professional football team that plays in the Mexican Football League. They were  playing in the Liga Premier (Mexico's Third Division). León Fútbol Club Premier was affiliated with Club León who plays in the Liga MX. The games were held in the city of León in the Estadio Casa Club León.

Players

Current squad

References

Liga Premier de México
Football clubs in Guanajuato